Chang'an Subdistrict is a subdistrict and the seat of Linxiang City in Hunan, China. The subdistrict was reformed through the amalgamation of Baiyun Town, Chengnan Township and the former Chang'an Subdistrict on November 24, 2015. It is located in the west central Linxiang City, it is bordered by Wulipai Subdistrict to the east, Zhongfang Town and Taolin Town to the south, Yunxi District to the west and north. Through the amalgamation of village-level divisions in 2016, the town has 6 villages and 6 communities under its jurisdiction. Its seat is Matangpu Community.

References

External links
 Official Website (Chinese / 中文)

Linxiang, Hunan
Subdistricts of Hunan